The year 525 BC was a year of the pre-Julian Roman calendar. In the Roman Empire, it was known as year 229  Ab urbe condita. The denomination 525 BC for this year has been used since the early medieval period, when the Anno Domini calendar era became the prevalent method in Europe for naming years.

Events

By place

Egypt 
 Battle of Pelusium - Cambyses II of Persia conquers Egypt by painting cats and other animals sacred to the Egyptians on his soldiers' shields. The Egyptians run in fear of "harming" these animals. It is said that after the battle, Cambyses hurled cats in the faces of the Egyptians in scorn that they would sacrifice their country for the safety of their animals.
 Cambyses takes Psamtik III prisoner and treats him kindly until he tries to raise a revolt, at which point Psamtik is executed.
 The Twenty-sixth Dynasty ends, and the Twenty-seventh Dynasty begins.
Somalia

 After conquering Egypt, the Persian king Cambyses II sent ambassadors to Macrobia, bringing luxury gifts for the Macrobian king to entice his submission. The Macrobian king replied instead with a challenge for his Persian counterpart in the form of an unstrung bow: if the Persians could manage to string it, they would have the right to invade his country; but until then, they should thank the gods that the Macrobians never decided to invade their empire.

Astronomy 
 September 17, 525 BC- Venus occult Antares the next such occurrence will not take place until November 17, 2400 AD.

Births 
 Aeschylus, author of Greek tragedies

Deaths 
 Psammetichus III, Egyptian pharaoh
 Anaximenes of Miletus, Greek scientist and philosopher (b. 585 BC)

References